Quindocqua United Methodist Church is a historic United Methodist church located at Marion, Somerset County, Maryland. It is a single-story, roughly cruciform frame building resting on a raised foundation of common bond brick erected in 1913. It features pointed-arch colored glass windows on three sides, fishscale shingles in the gables, and a three-story bell tower topped by a pyramidal roof.  The interior presents a well-preserved example of early-20th-century church design with its ramped floor, semicircular seating, pressed metal ceiling, and period lighting fixtures.

It was listed on the National Register of Historic Places in 1996.

References

External links
, including photo from 1994, at Maryland Historical Trust

United Methodist churches in Maryland
Churches on the National Register of Historic Places in Maryland
Churches in Somerset County, Maryland
Churches completed in 1913
Carpenter Gothic church buildings in Maryland
1913 establishments in Maryland
National Register of Historic Places in Somerset County, Maryland